Red Lick is a city in Bowie County, Texas, United States. It is part of the Texarkana metropolis. The population was 1,008 at the 2010 census, and 946 in 2020.

Geography

Red Lick is located in eastern Bowie County at  (33.472478, –94.169552). Interstate 30 touches the southern border of the city, but the nearest access is either from Nash to the east or Leary to the west.

Demographics

According to the 2000 U.S. census, there were 853 people, 302 households, and 266 families residing in the city. The racial makeup of the city was 95.08% White, 3.17% African American, 0.47% Native American, 0.12% Asian, 0.35% from other races, and 0.82% from two or more races. Hispanic or Latino of any race were 0.94% of the population.

There were 302 households, out of which 44.0% had children under the age of 18 living with them, 78.1% were married couples living together, 7.3% had a female householder with no husband present, and 11.6% were non-families. 10.6% of all households were made up of individuals, and 3.0% had someone living alone who was 65 years of age or older. The average household size was 2.82 and the average family size was 3.03.

In the city, the population was spread out, with 30.0% under the age of 18, 5.2% from 18 to 24, 26.8% from 25 to 44, 30.7% from 45 to 64, and 7.3% who were 65 years of age or older. The median age was 37 years. For every 100 females, there were 97.0 males. For every 100 females age 18 and over, there were 87.7 males.

The median income for a household in the city was $57,045, and the median income for a family was $60,313. Males had a median income of $50,909 versus $23,333 for females. The per capita income for the city was $22,703. About 4.1% of families and 3.9% of the population were below the poverty line, including 2.6% of those under age 18 and 10.9% of those age 65 or over.

Education
Red Lick is served by the Red Lick Independent School District.

References

Cities in Bowie County, Texas
Cities in Texas
Cities in Texarkana metropolitan area